Ljusdal is a locality and the seat of Ljusdal Municipality, Gävleborg County, Sweden with 6,230 inhabitants in 2010.

Ljusdal is situated on Riksväg 83 which runs between   Tönnebro   in Söderhamn Municipality  in Gävleborg County and Ånge in Västernorrland County. It is located beside the river Ljusnan which goes from Bruksvallarna to the Gulf of Bothnia.
Ljusdal is noted for having hosted the annual Bandy World Cup in the sport of bandy from 1974 to 2008.

Three Decorated Farmhouses of Hälsingland situated in Ljusdal Municipality were inscribed in 2012 on the UNESCO list of World Heritage Sites.

Sports
The following sports clubs are located in Ljusdal:

 Ljusdals IF
 Ljusdals bandyklubb
 Ljusdals ridklubb
 Ljusdals judoklubb
 Ljusdals karateklubb

Gallery

See also
Ljusdal Municipality

References 

 
Populated places in Ljusdal Municipality
Hälsingland
Municipal seats of Gävleborg County
Swedish municipal seats